Caizi Township is a township in Puge County, Liangshan Yi Autonomous Prefecture, Sichuan, China. , Caizi's jurisdicted villages are:
Weixing Village
Qianjin Village
Gangtie Village
Tuanjie Village
Xianfeng Village

See also 
 List of township-level divisions of Sichuan

References 

Puge County
Township-level divisions of Sichuan